Walter Eugene Clark (September 8, 1881 – September 30, 1960), was an American philologist. He was the second Wales Professor of Sanskrit at Harvard University and editor of the volumes 38-44 of the Harvard Oriental Series. He translated the Aryabhatiya of Aryabhata with critical notes which was published in 1930, by the University of Chicago Press.

Education
Clark was born on September 8, 1881 in Digby, Nova Scotia and came to the United States in 1883.

Clark received his A.B. in 1903, A.M. in 1904 from Harvard. After receiving his Doctorate from Harvard in 1906, with the dissertation titled "Quid de rebus Indicis scirent Graeci prisci quaeritur" he went to Germany to Berlin to receive further training under the Indologist Richard Pischel.

He joined the "Department of Comparative Philology" at University of Chicago as the "Instructor in Sanskrit". In 1915, he was promoted to Assistant Professor of the "Department of Comparative
Philology, General Linguistics, and Indo-Iranian Philology" and from 1923 to 1927 as Associate Professor of Sanskrit.

In 1927 he became the Wales Professor of Sanskrit at Harvard. He held the position until his retirement in 1950. He was the editor of the volumes 38-44 of the Harvard Oriental Series after Charles Lanman.

He was a member of the American Oriental Society, the American Academy of Arts and Sciences, the Linguistic Society of America, the Royal Asiatic Society, and the Société Asiatique. Among his other positions he was appointed the second Master of the Kirkland House (1935–46) on September 1, 1935 succeeding Edward A. Whitney.

Bibliography

References

External links

 

1881 births
1960 deaths
Harvard University alumni
American philologists
Harvard University faculty
Canadian emigrants to the United States
20th-century philologists